The Third Adenauer cabinet was formed by incumbent Chancellor Konrad Adenauer after the 1957 federal election. The cabinet was sworn in on 29 October 1957, and remained until it was succeeded by the fourth Adenauer cabinet on 17 October 1961.

Composition

References and notes 

 

Coalition governments of Germany
Historic German cabinets
Cabinets established in 1957
Cabinets disestablished in 1961
1957 establishments in West Germany
1961 disestablishments in Germany
C3